Jordan Meads (born 16 February 1992) is a Greek international rugby league player who currently plays club football with rugby union club University of the Sunshine Barbarians.

Early life
Meads grew up in Wellington, New Zealand, and is of Greek descent on his mother's side. He lived on the Sunshine Coast in Queensland, Australia for a period during his teenage years, attending Mountain Creek State High School and Sunshine Coast Grammar School.

Career
After a stint with the Melbourne Storm, Meads joined the New Zealand Warriors. He is well remembered for his man of the match performance in the 2011 NYC (under 20s) Grand Final against the North Queensland Cowboys, where he kicked the match-winning field goal during golden point extra-time.

Meads left the Warriors in August 2012 to join Sporting Olympique Avignon in the Elite One Championship. He signed with the Sunshine Coast Sea Eagles in the Queensland Cup in January 2013, spending one season there before moving to the Kawana Dolphins in 2014. He joined the League 1 side Gateshead Thunder mid-season in June 2014, scoring 15 tries in 23 matches before leaving the club in July 2015, citing family reasons. Meads subsequently returned to Australia and re-joined Kawana in the Caloundra RSL Cup.

As captain-coach, Meads lead the Beerwah Bulldogs to the 2020 division 1 premiership, the club's first in 41 years.

In 2021 he transferred to rugby union side University of the Sunshine Coast Barbarians with the side going on to win the Sunshine Coast Rugby Union Grand Final.

International career
Meads captained the team during the 2018 European Championship C, and was named in the Greek squad for the 2018 Emerging Nations World Championship, but did not take the field during the tournament. The following year, he captained the team as they qualified for their first ever Rugby League World Cup.

References

External links
Greece profile
Greek profile

1992 births
Living people
Greece national rugby league team captains
Greece national rugby league team players
New Zealand people of Greek descent
New Zealand rugby league players
Newcastle Thunder players
Rugby league fullbacks
Rugby league halfbacks
Sporting Olympique Avignon players
Sunshine Coast Falcons players
Rugby league players from Wellington City
New Zealand expatriate sportspeople in France
Greek expatriate sportspeople in France
New Zealand expatriate sportspeople in Australia
Greek expatriate sportspeople in Australia
Greek expatriate sportspeople in England
New Zealand expatriate sportspeople in England
New Zealand expatriate rugby league players
Expatriate rugby league players in France
Expatriate rugby league players in Australia
Expatriate rugby league players in England